Friend(s) of Mine may refer to:

Music 
"Friend of Mine" (The Screaming Jets song), 1995
"Friend of Mine" (Treble Charger song), 1997
"Friend of Mine" (Kelly Price song), 1998
Friend of Mine (Greg Brown album), 1993
Friends of Mine (Ramblin' Jack Elliott album), 1998
Friends of Mine (Adam Green album), 2003
"Friend of Mine", a song by Grave Digger from their 1985 album Witch Hunter
"Friend of Mine", a song by Screaming Jets from their 1994 album The Screaming Jets
"Friend of Mine", a song by Lea Salonga from her 2000 album Lea... In Love
"Friend of Mine", a song by Cephalic Carnage from their 2002 album Lucid Interval
"Friend of Mine", a song by Eve 6 from their 2003 album It's All in Your Head
"Friend of Mine", a song by Lily Allen from her 2006 album Alright, Still
"Friend of Mine", a song by Avicii from his 2017 album Avīci (01)
"Friends of Mine", a song by The Zombies from their 1968 album Odessey and Oracle
"Friends of Mine", a song by The Guess Who from their 1968 album Wheatfield Soul
"Friends of Mine", a song by Buzzcocks from their 1977 album Spiral Scratch (EP)
"Friends of Mine", a song by Duran Duran from their 1981 album Duran Duran
"Friends O' Mine", a song by Bowling for Soup from their 2004 album A Hangover You Don't Deserve
"A Friend of Mine", a song by Fields from their 1971 eponymous album
"A Friend of Mine", a song by Gilbert O'Sullivan from his 1973 album I'm a Writer, Not a Fighter

Film 
 A Friend of Mine (2006 film) (Ein Freund von mir), a 2006 German feature film.
 A Friend of Mine (2011 film), a 2011 Estonian film

See also 
"Any Friend of Nicholas Nickleby's is a Friend of Mine" story by Ray Bradbury in the collection I Sing the Body Electric (Bradbury)
"He Was a Friend of Mine", traditional folk song recorded by Dave Van Ronk, Bob Dylan and many others
"Just a Friend of Mine", a 1990 song by Vaya Con Dios
These Friends of Mine, the original title of the American television comedy Ellen
 for "friend of mine" or "friend of ours" in slang of the Mafia, see Made man
 Example of double genitive